Contra Viento y Marea (English title: Against all odds) is a Venezuelan telenovela written by Leonardo Padrón and produced by Venevisión in 1997. This telenovela lasted 125 episodes and was distributed internationally by Venevisión International.

Guillermo Dávila and Ana Karina Manco starred as the main protagonists with Mimí Lazo, Carolina Perpetuo and Carlos Olivier as the antagonists.

Synopsis 
For Daniela Borges true love was lost almost twenty years ago, when a violent tragedy separated her from Sebastian Leon. She has now been married for 18 years to a rich businessman and they have a teenage daughter. But fate is about to give Daniela the most difficult test she'll ever have to face: Sebastian’s unexpected return.

It all began when Daniela and Sebastian were 16 years old. The minute they met, they knew they were meant for each other and came to share the kind of passion neither one would ever feel again. But Daniela's father, Don Ramon, had other plans for his daughter: marrying her to Aquiles Millan, a businessman with a brilliant future. Daniela and Sebastian suffered through Don Roman's stern opposition, which was fueled in great part by his wife, Dona Jose, a possessive, commanding woman. Then, one fatal night, Sebastian decided to face Don Roman and let him know once and for all that he would never leave Daniela. Suddenly, a shot was heard in the study where they were arguing. When Daniela, her mother and her sister rushed in, they found Don Roman dead in the floor, with Sebastian standing over him. The consequences of that moment were devastating: Sebastian was sentenced to 20 years in prison, and Daniela was left to live with the horror of thinking he was responsible for her father's murder.
 
After the tragedy, Daniela gave in to her mother's wishes and soon married Aquiles Millan. The marriage, however, has never been a happy one - she is not in love with Aquiles, who turned out to be an insensitive womanizer. For the past 18 years Daniela has been going through the motions, trying to forget the past. But even now, she is still overcome with a mixture of love and hate for Sebastian - even though she believes he was killed a long time ago during a prison revolt.

Daniela's life will be dramatically altered by Sebastian's reappearance. He has done his time and is now back to fulfill his obsession: proving his innocence, getting revenge on the real killer and winning Daniela back. The last part of his plan will be the hardest - because on the road to recovering her love he'll be confronted with strong adversaries. Among them: Virginia Lugo, a dangerously twisted psychologist who is in love with him, Doña Jose, Aquiles and Daniela herself, who is torn between what her heart tells her and her commitments as a wife and mother. A ghost from the past rekindles the flame of an irrepressible passion. Will this love be stronger than reason? Sometimes, the past shows up when we least expect it.

Cast
Guillermo Dávila as Sebastián León
Ana Karina Manco as Daniela Borges Montilla de Millán
Carolina Perpetuo as Virginia Lugo
Mimi Lazo as Josefina "Doña José" Montilla Vda. de Borges
Carlos Olivier as Aquiles Millán
Gigi Zancheta as Xiomara Quintana
Juan Carlos Vivas as El Duque
Elizabeth Morales as Susana
Yanis Chimaras as Jesús "Chúo" García
Lourdes Valera as La Zurda
Roberto Lamarca as Nicolas
Elba Escobar as Mistica Gamboa
Gustavo Rodríguez as Alvaro Luján
Jonathan Montenegro as Ignacio
Deyalit Lopez as Azucar
Eileen Abad as La Nena
Virginia Garcia as Valeria Borges
Maria Eugenia Perera as Thamara
Tatiana Padron as Fabiola
Margarita Hernandez as Lupe
Aitor Gaviria as Tobias
Romelia Aguero as Crisalida
Jose Torres as Zorba
Sofia Diaz as Gabrielita

References

External links
Contra Viento y Marea at the Internet Movie Database

1997 telenovelas
Venevisión telenovelas
Venezuelan telenovelas
1997 Venezuelan television series debuts
1997 Venezuelan television series endings
Spanish-language telenovelas
Television shows set in Venezuela